Mad River was an American psychedelic rock band, who were briefly popular in the late 1960s.  They released two albums on Capitol Records.

Mad River formed at Antioch College in Yellow Springs, Ohio in April 1966. The band took its name from the nearby Mad River. By March 1967, they had relocated to Berkeley, California. There they came to the attention of cult author Richard Brautigan who launched the band into the growing hippie culture. They released an EP on the independent Wee label before signing a contract with Capitol Records in February 1968. The group's lead songwriter was Lawrence Hammond, but all of the members sang vocals. They released two albums before disbanding in July 1969.

Lawrence Hammond put out several solo albums in the 1970s and 1980s, and Greg Dewey later joined Country Joe and the Fish, as well as playing with two of Marty Balin's post-Jefferson Airplane groups.

Greg Druian (corrected spelling of early member)

Members
David Robinson - guitar
Rick Bockner- guitar, vocals
Lawrence Hammond - bass, lead vocals
Tom Manning - bass, vocals (April - September 1966 / 6 & 12 string guitar - March 1967 - December 1968) 
Greg Dewey - drums, vocals
Greg Duian - guitar (April - 1966 - March 1967)

Discography
Mad River (Capitol Records, ST-2985. 1968) 
Paradise Bar and Grill (Capitol Records, 1969) U.S. No. 192
Both albums have been reissued by both Edsel and Sundazed Records.

References

External links
Brautigan.net article (accessed 5-25-10)

Musical groups established in 1965
Musical groups disestablished in 1970
Psychedelic rock music groups from California
Yellow Springs, Ohio
Rock music groups from Ohio